St Radegund's Church, Maplebeck is a Grade I listed Church of England parish in the Diocese of Southwell and Nottingham in Maplebeck.

History

The church dates from the 13th century, and was restored in 1898 by Charles Hodgson Fowler.

The vicarage was built in 1849 to the designs of Thomas Chambers Hine funded by Henry Pelham-Clinton, 4th Duke of Newcastle.

References

Grade I listed churches in Nottinghamshire
Church of England church buildings in Nottinghamshire